Axiopoena is a genus of tiger moths in the family Erebidae. The genus was erected by Ménétriés in 1842.

Species
The genus consists of the following species:
Axiopoena maura (Eichwald, 1830)
Axiopoena karelini Ménétriés, 1863

References

  (1989) "Revision of the genus Axiopoena (Lepidoptera, Arctiidae)". Vestnik zoologii. 1989 (1): 8-13, Kiev. 

Callimorphina
Moth genera